Lophocalotes is a genus of lizards in the family Agamidae. The genus, which is endemic to Sumatra, contains two species.

Species
The following two species are recognized as being valid.
Lophocalotes achlios   – white-throated crested dragon
Lophocalotes ludekingi  – crested lizard

Nota bene: A binomial authority in parentheses indicates that the species was originally described in a genus other than Lophocalotes.

References

Further reading
Günther A (1872). "On the Reptiles and Amphibians of Borneo". Proceedings of the Zoological Society of London 1872: 586–600 + Plates XXXV–XL. (Lophocalotes, new genus, p. 593).

 
Lizard genera
Taxa named by Albert Günther